Canadian singer Celine Dion is regarded as one of the most successful performers in pop music history. In a career spanning four decades, Dion has achieved a remarkable string of statistical successes, setting and shattering a number of world records. She is the all-time best-selling Canadian artist worldwide and the best-selling French-language artist in history with record sales reaching 200 to 250 million worldwide.

Due to her fame and success, a wide range of publications, such as music trade magazines and renowned newspapers, have given Dion variations of moniker, such as "Priestess of Pop", "Queen of Power Ballads" and "Queen of Adult Contemporary." She is also dubbed as the Greatest Living Singer. In 2023, Glamour Magazine ranked Dion number one on its list of the "Greatest Female Singers of all time."

Definition 

 Weekly or yearly achievements such as those from Billboard Year-End aren't included here, if don't represent an all-time records, by genre or cumulative feats.
 Countries with specific tabs only includes the most relevant music markets where Dion is big at: United States, Japan, UK, Germany, France & Canada.
 Notable records & achievements for the rest of the countries will be placed in one section (country specific records).
 Regional records and achievements (Europe, Asia etc) will also be grouped in one section.

Selected global and regional records and achievements 

The following are some of Dion's most remarkable global records.

United States

France

United Kingdom

Canada

Japan

Germany

Other notable records 
This section documents the rest of Dion's other notable records from around the world.
{| class="wikitable" style="text-align:left;"
!Records/achievements
! Notes
!Ref.
|-
| Best-selling female artist in South Africa
| As of 2007, Dion has sold 3 million albums in South Africa, the highest figure ever by a solo international artist.
|
|-scope="row" style="background:#FAEB86"
|Top earning artist of the decade (2000–2009)
|Dion was recognized by Los Angeles Times as the decade's top-earning artist, with combined album sales and concert revenue from the past decade eclipsing $748 million.
|
|-
|Best-selling International female artist in Switzerland
|Dion has sold 1.7 million certified sales in the country, the most by any other women in music.
|
|-
|Largest vocabulary for a female recording artist
|In 2015, Guinness World Records listed Dion as the tenth artist with the largest vocabulary in music (3,954).
|
|-
|Forbes''' wealthiest self-made women in music
|Dion is ranked as the fourth richest female artist in music by Forbes, with an estimated networth of $470 million. Although most sources stated that she's already at $800 million.
|
|-
|Most expensive disc ever given to an artist
|In March 2002, Dion was presented with the most expensive disc ever in recognition of 15 million album and single sales in the UK.
|
|-
| One of the most expensive music video of all time
| The entire production of "It's All Coming Back To Me Now" costs $2.3 million (or nearly $4 million adjusted for 2022 inflation).
|
|}

 List of prestigious honors and recognitions 

 Media responses and reception 

MTV credits Dion for redefining hardwork and hustle, saying she was better than the likes of Whitney Houston, Cher, Tina Turner and basically almost anyone at making the most of pop's capacity to express emotions in dramatic and extravagant ways. Jon O'brien of Grammy Awards called Dion, together with Whitney Houston and Mariah Carey as "The Holy Trinity of Pop Divas", and credited them for leading the rebirth of the golden era for female vocalists.

AEG live executive John Meglin said that Dion is a bigger artist than Michael Jackson (in live entertainment). He believed that she is right up there with the likes of the King Of Pop, possibly a more bankable star. Dion is without a doubt, a big fan of Jackson and said that she has posters of him in her room growing up. Jackson notably came and attended one of Dion's Vegas shows.

Polly Anthony (former president) of Epic Records Group said that Dion is the "epitome of a global artist", further adding that numerous people from all around the world have become devoted lovers of her voice. As of March 2003, Billboard reported that she has already sold 150 million albums worldwide, the most by any female artist at that point.

Eric Boehlert of Rolling Stone discussed Dion's selling power in an article published in 1998, stating that she has sold 22 million albums in just one year time in the United States. Furthermore, this is believed to be the most for any artist ever in history, implicating that it was "unthinkable" before for any solo artist to achieve such feat.

Yasmine Shemesh of Elle Canada discussed how Dion's Falling into You changed the landscape of Pop music, implicating that the album has played a vital role in influencing genre trends of the time. Andrew Lloyd Webber praised Dion's version of Its All Coming Back To Me Now, calling it "the record of the millennium."

 Dion's impact on other artists 

Its no surprise that Dion is a much-beloved superstar and is admired by even the biggest mainstream artists, including considered 'legends' in the music industry. At the 2017 Billboard Music Awards, Drake bowed to Dion upon meeting her and said the following words: "You’re very iconic, we love you" and expressed his desire of getting a tattoo of her face. In a special interview with Vogue, Adele revealed that a framed piece of Dion's used chewing gum with a handwritten note is her prized possession. Adele has also attended Dion's residency show in 2018 and her BST Hyde Park Festival gig in 2019.

In an episode of her podcast on Apple Music, Queen of Country-Pop Shania Twain expressed her admiration for Dion as a musical artist, saying that every recording of Dion is a vocal challenge for Twain in any case, eventually calling her one of the greatest vocalists of all time." Sam Smith said in an interview how It's All Coming Back to Me Now helped them get through tough times. Moreover, Smith tweeted about admiring Dion after attending one of her gigs in 2019, tweeting in capslock: “Celine Dion changed my life.”

After attending one of her Vegas shows in 2019, Kelly Clarkson tweeted that Dion is "possibly the most gifted vocalist on the planet''." In 2021, Clarkson praised her vocal ability, saying that the reason why Dion doesn't get tired because she has two set of lungs when she sing. Selena Gomez is also a big fan of Dion. She attended one of her Vegas shows in 2016 with her friends, wearing a Céline Dion t-shirt and filmed some special moments on her Snapchat. Frank Ocean revealed in an interview that Dion is one of the artists he grew up listening to, citing her as one of his musical influences.

Concerts gross and attendance records 

As a prominent figure in music, Celine Dion has set and broke multiple records in concepts of gross and attendance around the world. Below are examples:

See also 
 List of awards and nominations received by Celine Dion
 List of highest-grossing live music artists
 Best-selling albums in the United States since Nielsen SoundScan tracking began
 List of best-selling albums by women
 List of best-selling music artists
 List of fastest-selling albums
 List of best-selling albums in Europe
 List of best-selling female music artists

References 

Celine Dion
Dion, Celine